Niklas Karlström is a retired Swedish footballer. Karlström made 41 Allsvenskan appearances for Djurgården and scored 10 goals.

References

Swedish footballers
Djurgårdens IF Fotboll players
Association footballers not categorized by position
Year of birth missing